Alexandra 'Sacha' Prechal (born 15 March 1959 in Prague, Czechoslovakia) is a Dutch law professor and judge. She has been a judge at the European Court of Justice since 10 June 2010.

Biography
Prechal was born in 1959 in Prague. She studied law at the University of Groningen between 1977 and 1983 and received her title of Doctor of Laws at the University of Amsterdam in 1995. After receiving her initial law degree she started working as an academic lecturer of Law at Maastricht University until 1987. She then worked as a legal secretary at the Court of Justice of the European Communities between 1987 and 1991. She returned to the Netherlands to work as an academic lecturer at the Europe Institute of the Law faculty of the University of Amsterdam. After receiving her promotion in the same university in 1995 she moved to work as professor of European Law at Tilburg University. She held a position there from 1995 until 2003, when she moved to Utrecht University where she occupies the same position and is still currently employed.

In 2008 Prechal was made member of the Royal Netherlands Academy of Arts and Sciences.

In 2010 Prechal was appointed as a judge of the European Court of Justice. She succeeded Christiaan Timmermans as the Dutch judge. Prechal was named as the most powerful Dutch woman in the field of Justice and Public Order in 2012 by Opzij magazine.

Other activities
 European Constitutional Law Review, Member of the Board of Advisors
 Dutch Society for European Law, Member of the Board
 Royal Netherlands Academy of Arts and Sciences, Member

References

1959 births
Living people
Judges from Prague
21st-century Dutch judges
Dutch legal scholars
University of Groningen alumni
University of Amsterdam alumni
Academic staff of Maastricht University
Academic staff of the University of Amsterdam
Academic staff of Tilburg University
Academic staff of Utrecht University
Members of the Royal Netherlands Academy of Arts and Sciences
European Court of Justice judges
Dutch judges of international courts and tribunals
Czechoslovak emigrants to the Netherlands